Kahore is a town and union council of Bela Tehsil, Lasbela District, Balochistan, Pakistan.

Kahore is also a Maori word for(negative) no, not - a negative word used on its own or in a variety of sentence types. A variation of kāore.

References

Union councils of Lasbela District
Populated places in Lasbela District